Rake is an American comedy-drama television series and an adaptation of the Australian series of the same name, both of which are created by Peter Duncan. Duncan served as series producer with, among others, star Greg Kinnear, Peter Tolan, and Richard Roxburgh, on this version for Fedora Entertainment, Essential Media, and Sony Pictures Television. On May 8, 2013, the series was added to the Fox network's 2013–14 schedule as a mid-season entry. The series premiered on January 23, 2014, originally airing Thursdays on the network, before moving to Fridays late in the first season and eventually to Saturdays for the final two episodes. On May 7, 2014, Fox canceled the series after one season, but ultimately aired the produced episodes.

Premise
The series follows Keegan Deane, a criminal defense lawyer whose personal problems and self-destructive behavior have him battling wits and owing money to everyone around him, including his ex-wife, judges, an assistant district attorney, his bookie, a brothel owner, and the IRS.

Cast and characters

Main cast
 Greg Kinnear as Keegan Deane, the titular rake
 Miranda Otto as Maddy Deane, Keegan's ex-wife and a psychiatrist
 John Ortiz as Ben Leon, Keegan's best friend from law school
 Necar Zadegan as Scarlet Leon, Ben's wife and an ADA for Los Angeles
 Bojana Novakovic as Michaela "Mikki" Partridge, a $500-an-hour prostitute, with whom Keegan develops a romantic interest, who disappears and then turns up as a law student.
 Tara Summers as Leanne Zander, Keegan's personal assistant
 Jeffrey Nordling as Bruce Mangan, Maddy Deane's new boyfriend
 Ian Colletti as Finn Deane, Keegan's teenage son

Recurring cast
 Omar Dorsey as Roy, Keegan's creditor who routinely beats him on behalf of the loan shark to whom Deane owes a considerable amount of money. Keegan holds no grudges and the two men are otherwise friendly.
 Anne Gee Byrd as Frances Leon, Ben's mother, who despises Deane
 Cedric Yarbrough as Jules, Mikki's flamboyant former pimp
 Elizabeth Ho as Debbie Lee, daughter of a creditor to whom Deane owed money. She has inherited the family business and forces Keegan to rent an apartment her aunt owns in Echo Park and has threatened to have her cousins break his legs if he doesn't pay up.
 Damon Gupton as Mayor of Los Angeles Marcus Barzmann
 Kim Hawthorne as Gloria Barzmann

Production
The early episodes were aired out of order, as the original pilot, written by Peter Duncan and directed by Sam Raimi, had "an overload of not drama ... but maybe a little sadness," according to producer Peter Tolan. He added, "[it] worked against the episode. And so we refigured it, sort of toning that down". The episode originally portrays Keegan Deane (Greg Kinnear) in an unhealthy mental and physical state.

Episode 13, "Mammophile", should be viewed after episode 5, "Bigamist", to maintain continuity.

Critical reception
Rake scored 62 out of 100 on Metacritic based on reviews from 33 critics, indicating "generally favorable" reviews. Rotten Tomatoes gives the show a rating of 66%, based on 38 reviews, with the site's consensus stating: "Rake'''s smart blend of comedy and drama makes it the perfect vehicle for Greg Kinnear's offbeat charm and dry humor".

Hank Stuever (The Washington Post) gave it a B+ grade, positing that "House comparisons will surely abound, but Rake is easily one of the more confident network dramas to come our way of late. It's a procedural ... but it's just unorthodox enough to make me eager to see more." The Los Angeles Times Mary McNamara stated "Rake owes more to the increasingly humane tone of family and female-based comedies like Modern Family and Parks and Recreation than Rescue Me, which could (fingers crossed) indicate a similar journey to the light for the ever-popular tortured white male." Jeff Jensen from Entertainment Weekly awarded the series a B grade, stating "Rake is yet another show that tries to entertain us with a boorish, morally sketchy protagonist. Comparisons have been made to House or cable drama cads like Don Draper, but it's the differences from the 'Unlikeable Antihero' archetypes of current TV that define the show."

Not all reviews were favorable: James Poniewozik of Time stated "You get the sense that the show ... is vacillating. Maybe it wants to be the kind of raw indictment/worship of reckless masculinity we've seen on cable. Or maybe it wants to be a more picaresque version of House, with a little less genius and a little more self-degradation." The Huffington Posts Maureen Ryan said "Part of the problem is Rake's diffidence about how bad a guy Keane is supposed to be. He's clearly a raging narcissist, yet the show deflects that aspect of his personality and tries to make him seem a little bit adorable. If we're supposed to fear that the worst aspects of his personality will land him in serious trouble, the tidy resolutions of various story points in the pilot seem to preclude that possibility ... Rake'' isn't a bad show, it just doesn't appear to have the courage of its convictions."

Episodes

References

External links
 
 

2010s American black comedy television series
2010s American comedy-drama television series
2010s American legal television series
2014 American television series debuts
2014 American television series endings
American television series based on Australian television series
English-language television shows
Fox Broadcasting Company original programming
Television series by Sony Pictures Television
Television shows set in Los Angeles